"It's Late (And I Have to Go)" is a single by Canadian country music artist Carroll Baker. Released in 1971, it was the second single from her album Mem'ries of Home and peaked at number forty-four on the RPM Country Tracks chart. The song was re-released in 1977 and reached number one on the RPM Country Tracks chart in Canada in July 1977.

Chart performance

References

1971 singles
1977 singles
Carroll Baker songs
1971 songs
RCA Records singles